The 1935 Washington University Bears football team was an American football team that represented Washington University in St. Louis as a member of the Missouri Valley Conference (MVC) during the 1935 college football season. In its fourth season under head coach Jimmy Conzelman, the team compiled a 6–4 record (3–0 against MVC opponents), tied for the MVC championship, and outscored opponents by a total of 185 to 149. The team played its home games at Francis Field in St. Louis.

Schedule

References

Washington University
Washington University Bears football seasons
Missouri Valley Conference football champion seasons
Washington University Bears football